The Sino-Singapore Tianjin Eco-city (SSTEC) is a planned city developed jointly between the governments of China and Singapore. Located in Binhai, the project was deliberately built on "non-arable" land with a "water shortage" to the southeast of Tianjin's urban core, for the declared purpose of serving as a "demonstration that sustainable urbanisation could be achieved despite difficult environmental challenges". The city initially planned to house 350,000 people by 2020, but, as of 2021, still aims to house that amount at some point in the future.

History

Background 
On April 25 2007, then Senior Minister of Singapore Goh Chok Tong and former Chinese Premier Wen Jiabao met and discussed the idea of a planned city to aid with China's rapid urbanization and pursuit of sustainable development.

On 18 November 2007, Singaporean Prime Minister Lee Hsien Loong and Wen Jiabao signed a Framework Agreement for the development of the Sino-Singapore Tianjin Eco-city. The aim of the agreement was to develop a planned city which was practical, replicable and scalable, and would be more environmentally conscious, particularly in regard to resource and energy conservation. The city would then serve as a model for sustainable development for other cities in China.

The Singaporean government formed a Ministerial Committee in 2011 in order to improve the coordination and support among its agencies for the project – reportedly a sign of the importance of the project to Singapore.

Aims 
In 2008, the governments of Singapore and China laid out 26 key performance indicators (KPIs) to measure the city's future ecological, economic, and social development. These initial 26 KPIs comprised 22 quantitative measures and 4 qualitative measures, and included guidelines for air quality, water quality, noise pollution, wetland and shoreline protection, urban greenspace, water consumption, modes of transportation, waste generation, local employment opportunities, and other areas. In 2018, the city's KPIs were updated and reformulated to span 30 quantitative measures and 6 qualitative measures. These revised KPIs lay out targets set for 2023, 2028, and 2035.

Construction 
The groundbreaking ceremony of the Sino-Singapore Tianjin Eco-city was held on 28 September 2008. Singapore Senior Minister Goh Chok Tong and Chinese Premier Wen Jiabao officiated at the event, signifying the beginning of construction work on the Eco-city. The plan was developed in 2008 through a collaborative council between public and private entities. A Joint Steering Council, Joint Working Committee, and the Sino-Singapore Tianjin Eco-City Investment and Development Co., Ltd have worked together to promote the three main initiatives of the project: environmental protection, social development, and economic development.

Initial construction began in 2008 with an  start-up area, consisting of "three Community Centres, the Eco-city Administrative Committee Service Centre, and several residential and industrial developments."

On 27 May 2011, the National Animation Industrial Park opened in the eco-city. The city's first residents, 60 families, moved in to the eco-city in March 2012. The eco-city's first community centre was opened on 5 November 2013.

The city's water reclamation plant was opened on 25 June 2017. The city's centre was officially launched on 1 July 2018. The high quality of water provided to the city is only planned to benefit its own inhabitants, while the rest of the municipality awaits to attain the same water quality in the future.

Beginning in 2019, construction began on the city's "Central District", which will serve as the city's urban core.

Completion of this phase were completed by 2013, but attention turned toward the creating a vibrant city center, which, as of 2021, is still under construction. The Ministry of National Development addressed the importance of designing a space where work, leisure, and sustainability can intersect through a "Green Smart Hub" and Friendship Garden. Both native plants and exotic plants have been planted in order to balance different interests; native plants serve as a source of pollination, food, and other functions for the natural environment, whereas inhabitants enjoy a diversity of aesthetically beautiful plants that are often exotic (even artificial leaves in mid-winter on one of the streets have been observed).

Geography
The Sino-Singapore Tianjin Eco-city is located in Binhai, along the Bohai Bay. The southern tip of the eco-city site only a 10-minute drive from the Tianjin Economic-Technological Development Area (TEDA).

Prior to the development of the city, the area of the project largely comprised saltpans, barren land, and polluted bodies of water. It previously constituted a center for salt mining, a site for carbon sink at wetlands, and a century-old cultural landscape praised by the Chinese poet Fan Bin.

The city also aims to respect existing structures in the area. The profile of the Ji Canal, which is 1,000 years old, will be retained. Two existing villages within the Eco-city site will also be conserved through adaptive reuse or partial rebuilding.

Population 
Early in its construction, the city failed to attract many residents. The city's first residents moved in during March 2012. An April 2014 piece by The Guardian put the city's population at around 6,000, and noted that many of the city's buildings were unoccupied. However, the city reported a substantially higher population of 20,000 in 2014. The Guardian reported that the area offered relatively inexpensive apartments and school tuition vis-à-vis other areas in Tianjin, and that developers hoped that this would attract more residents. In subsequent years, the city's population grew rapidly, and the city reported a population of over 80,000 in 2018.

In April 2019, China Daily reported that the city's population was approximately 100,000. However, this is well short of the project's initial goal of housing 350,000 people by 2020.

A public housing complex based on Singapore's public housing policies, including a "'home ownership' scheme," is aimed at meeting the housing needs of lower and lower-middle income groups in society.

Layout 
The Sino-Singapore Tianjin Eco-city describes its layout as "1 Axis, 3 Centres, 4 Districts". The "1 Axis" references an "Eco-valley" that cuts through the city, for the purpose of "providing a scenic trail for pedestrians and cyclists". The "3 Centres" refers to the three planned centres of the city: one along the southern banks of the Ji Canal, one to the city's north, and a third in the city's south. Finally, the "4 Districts" refer to the four residential districts in the city's southern, central, northern, and northeastern portions. Each district is made up different  neighborhoods with individual commercial centres and public amenities. The city's four districts are further divided into several "Eco-neighborhoods", which each comprise four "Eco-cells", which are basic  by  blocks. The "Eco-cells" are intended to incentivize walking by minimizing the travel distance, and thereby reducing time poverty. Views of the waterfront are retained by a reduction in building heights.

Parks 
The China-Singapore Friendship Garden serves as the city's main park, spanning an area of  along the Ji Canal.

Energy usage 
The "1 Axis" and "Eco-cell" designs are meant to facilitate walking and cycling instead of using vehicles. Renewable energy is planned to produce at least 32% of energy for the city by 2035.

Transportation 
The city's "Eco-valley" serves as a walking and cycling pathway that cuts through the city.

To encourage drivers to use electric vehicles, charging stations have been placed across the city.

A light-rail transit system, supplemented by a secondary network of trams and buses, will be the main mode of transportation in the Eco-city, which developers hope will help to reduce its carbon emissions. Construction is currently underway on the new , part of the Tianjin Metro, which will connect the city with Beijing. The line is expected to be complete by 2023.

See also 
Binhai
Suzhou Industrial Park
Urban Planning Society of China
Yujiabao Financial District

References

External links
The Sino-Singapore Tianjin Eco-city Website (Singapore)
The Sino-Singapore Tianjin Eco-city Website (China)
Bluepath Engineering Consultancy
Tianjin Eco-City In China: The Future Of Urban Development? - slideshow at The Huffington Post

Geography of Tianjin
Economy of Tianjin
New Urbanism communities
China–Singapore relations
Planned cities in China